David Benson Reed (born February 16, 1927) was the first Bishop of Colombia and the sixth Bishop of Kentucky in the Episcopal Church.

Early life and education
Reed was born in Tulsa, Oklahoma, on February 16, 1927, to Paul Spencer Reed and Bonnie Frances Taylor. He graduated from Harvard University with a Bachelor of Arts in 1948, and then with a Bachelor of Divinity from the Virginia Theological Seminary in 1951.

Ordained Ministry
Reed was ordained deacon in 1951. He then left for Costa Rica where he served at the Church of the Good Shepherd in San José, Costa Rica. He was then ordained priest on February 14, 1952, by Reginald Heber Gooden, Bishop of the Panama Canal Zone in St Luke's Cathedral, Ancón, Panama. Between 1952 and 1958 he served numerous parishes in the Panama Canal Zone and Colombia. In 1958, he travelled back to the United States to serve as assistant in the Executive Council's Overseas Department in New York City. In 1962, he became vicar of St Matthew's Church in Rapid City, South Dakota, and served as a missionary to the Lakota Indians.

Episcopacy
In 1963, Reed was elected as the first Episcopal Bishop of Colombia (which included Ecuador) and was consecrated on April 25, 1964, by Presiding Bishop Arthur C. Lichtenberger. Ultimately he spent a total of fifteen years in South America before returning to the United States. In 1972, Bishop Reed was elected Coadjutor Bishop under the fifth Bishop of Kentucky, Charles Gresham Marmion. In 1974, Bishop Marmion retired and Bishop Reed became sixth Bishop of Kentucky. By then, he was known as a strong supporter of diversity and inclusivity. His diocese was one of the first to appoint women as priests after the Episcopal Church convention approved such an action in 1976.

When the Rev. John Moore Hines announced that he would stop officiating at marriages and communion services as his protest against the Episcopal church's denial of the ordination of women to the priesthood and episcopate, Bishop David B. Reed consented to inhibit Hines from these duties until the last day of the next Episcopal General Convention (then scheduled for September 23, 1976). The church press release stated that the Bishop's inhibition indicated official recognition of Hines' protest.

In 1986, Bishop Reed led a year-long search to fill the deanship of Christ Church Cathedral in Louisville. On November 25, 1986, he and the cathedral chapter announced the selection of Rev. Geralyn Wolf, vicar of the 60-member St. Mary's church in Philadelphia. According to The Washington Post, Rev. Wolf is the first woman named to an Episcopal cathedral deanship since the American church allowed the ordination of women in 1976. The Post article also stated that a cathedral deanship is often the first step toward an ultimate selection as a bishop. In 1994, upon Bishop Reed's retirement, Edwin Funsten Gulick was elected as Bishop of Kentucky.

References

External links
 Bishop coadjutor#Anglican communion

1927 births
Possibly living people
People from Tulsa, Oklahoma
People from Louisville, Kentucky
Harvard College alumni
American expatriates in Colombia
20th-century Anglican bishops in South America
20th-century Anglican bishops in the United States
American expatriate bishops
American expatriates in Costa Rica
American expatriates in Panama
Episcopal bishops of Colombia
Episcopal bishops of Kentucky